The Sakhalin sturgeon (Acipenser mikadoi) is a species of fish in the family Acipenseridae. It is found in Japan and Russia.

Environment
The Sakhalin sturgeon is known to be found in either a marine or freshwater environment within demersal depth range. This species is found in brackish waters. They are also native to a tropical climate.

Size
The Sakhalin sturgeon has reached the maximum recorded length of about 150 centimeters or about 59 inches as a tall fish.

Biology
The Sakhalin sturgeon is considered to be a species that migrates up the river from the sea in order to spawn. During the months of April to May, the Sakhalin sturgeon feeds in the freshwater and then returns to the ocean during the summer.
The Sakhalin sturgeon (Acipenser mikadoi), which lives in the Amur River basin in China and Russia, and the green sturgeon (A. medirostris), which lives along the Pacific coast of North America, are two different species of sturgeon. Despite their geographical isolation, these two species may have had a recent common ancestor due to the similarities in their mitochondrial genomes.

Identification
The Sakhalin sturgeon is recorded to be the colors of olive-green and dark green. Its sides have a yellowish white color and it includes an olive green stripe. The bottom lip of this species is split into two.

Distribution
The Sakhalin sturgeon is commonly found in the areas of Northwest Pacific, Bering Sea, Tumnin or Datta river, northern Japan, and Korea. This species currently spawns persistently in the Tumnin River.

Threats
The threats that are affecting the population of the Sakhalin sturgeon include illegal poaching, trawling, accidental bycatch, pollution, and construction of dams.

Currently, the species' population is significantly decreasing and is on the brink of extinction.

Common names
The common names of the Sakhalin sturgeon in various languages include the following:
Acipenser mikadoi : Italian (Italiano)
Mikado Chôzame (帝蝶鮫) : Japanese (日本語) 
Jeseter severní : Czech (česky)
Mikadosampi : Finnish (suomen kieli)
Sakhalin sturgeon : English
сахалинский осетр : Russian (русский язык)
米氏鱘 : Mandarin Chinese
米氏鲟 : Mandarin Chinese

Taxonomy
According to recent genetic data, the differences between the mitogenomes of the Sakhalin sturgeon (Acipenser mikadoi) and the Green sturgeon (Acipenser medirostris) to correspond to the variability at the intraspecific level. The time since the divergence of the Sakhalin sturgeon and the Green sturgeon may be approximately 160,000 years.

References

Sources

Acipenser
Fish of East Asia
Fish of Japan
Fish of Russia
sturgeon
Critically endangered fish
Critically endangered biota of Asia
Taxonomy articles created by Polbot
Taxa named by Franz Martin Hilgendorf
Fish described in 1892